The gare d'Eu-la-Mouillette (Eu-la Mouillette Station) is a former railway station in the commune of Eu in the Seine-Maritime department, France.

The station was served by TER Picardie trains from Beauvais to Le Tréport-Mers. Although it is closer to the town centre of Eu, it is not the main station: that is Eu station. It was closed in 2011.

See also 
 List of SNCF stations in Hauts-de-France

References

Defunct railway stations in Seine-Maritime